Prospect is a historic plantation house located near Topping, Middlesex County, Virginia.  The house was constructed between 1820 and 1850, and is a -story, five-bay, frame dwelling with a gable roof in the Federal style. Two 38-foot chimneys abut each end of the house and the front and rear facades have identical gable-roofed porticos.  Also on the property are the contributing a 19th-century carriage house, an early 1900s farm shed, and the original brick-lined well.

It was listed on the National Register of Historic Places in 2004.

References

Plantation houses in Virginia
Houses on the National Register of Historic Places in Virginia
Federal architecture in Virginia
Houses completed in 1849
Houses in Middlesex County, Virginia
National Register of Historic Places in Middlesex County, Virginia
1849 establishments in Virginia